Kurmasana (IAST: kūrmāsana), Tortoise Pose, or Turtle Pose is a sitting forward bending asana in hatha yoga and modern yoga as exercise.

Etymology and origins

The name comes from the Sanskrit कूर्म Kūrma, "turtle" or "tortoise" and आसन Āsana, "posture" or "seat".

Uttana Kurmasana is described in the ancient, c. 7th century Ahirbudhnya Saṃhitā,  and illustrated in the 19th century Jogapradipika and Sritattvanidhi.

The modern Kurmasana is described in B. K. S. Iyengar's 1966 Light on Yoga. Iyengar states that the asana is dedicated to Kurma, the tortoise incarnation of the god Vishnu.

Description

To enter kūrmāsana a practitioner sits with the legs outstretched, feet as wide apart as possible. The knees are bent slightly, keeping the heels in contact with the floor. The body is leaned forward from the hips and the hands slid under the knees. The body leans forward (bending at the hips) to allow the hands and arms to slide sideways and backward (under the knees) until the elbows lie near the back of the knees. The heels are pushed forward and legs are straightened as much as possible. The forehead or chin is brought to touch the floor. The arms are further brought around the back to interlock the hands under the buttocks.

Variations

Supta Kurmasana (Sleeping Tortoise Pose) has the forehead on the floor, the feet crossed behind the head, and the arms reaching around the legs, hands clasped behind the back.

Uttana Kurmasana (Upside-Down Tortoise Pose) has the arms threaded through the crossed legs as in Kukkutasana (Cockerel Pose), the back on the ground, and the palms of the hands on the neck.

See also

 Garbha Pindasana - the same limb positions as Uttana Kurmasana, but with the body upright, balancing
 List of asanas

References

Sources

 
 
 
 
 

Sitting asanas
Forward bend asanas
Medieval Hatha Yoga asanas